Nepotilla lamellosa is a species of sea snail, a marine gastropod mollusk in the family Raphitomidae.

Description
The length of the shell attains 4 mm, its diameter 2 mm.

This is a very characteristic minute shell containing 5 whorls. The protoconch is smooth.  The angular whorls of the spire form a tabulated spire. The spiral tricarinate keels, of which there are four on the body whorl, as well as the interstices, are crossed by fine close lamellae. The suture is minutely chanelled. The base of the shell is contracted, lirate and slightly rostrate. The aperture is rather expanded. The outer lip is arcuate and strongly sinuated. The unique specimen is straw-coloured, with a single brown blotch in front.

Distribution
This marine species is endemic to Australia and occurs off Victoria, South Australia and Tasmania

References

 Verco, J.C. 1909. Notes on South Australian marine Mollusca with descriptions of new species. Part XII. Transactions of the Royal Society of South Australia 33: 293–342
 May, W.L. 1923. An illustrated index of Tasmanian shells: with 47 plates and 1052 species. Hobart : Government Printer 100 pp.
 Powell, A.W.B. 1966. The molluscan families Speightiidae and Turridae, an evaluation of the valid taxa, both Recent and fossil, with list of characteristic species. Bulletin of the Auckland Institute and Museum. Auckland, New Zealand 5: 1–184, pls 1–23

External links
  Hedley, C. 1922. A revision of the Australian Turridae. Records of the Australian Museum 13(6): 213-359, pls 42-56 
 
 Grove, S.J. (2018). A Guide to the Seashells and other Marine Molluscs of Tasmania: Nepotilla lamellosa

lamellosa
Gastropods described in 1896
Gastropods of Australia